Pinsker's hawk-eagle (Nisaetus pinskeri), south Philippine hawk-eagle or Mindanao hawk-eagle, is a species of bird of prey in the family Accipitridae. It is endemic to the Philippines native to the islands of Leyte, Samar, Negros, Basilan, Bohol and Mindanao. It is found in primary moist lowland forest and tropical moist montane forest up to 1,900 m. It is threatened by habitat loss and hunting. IUCN estimates just 600–800 mature birds left.

Description 

It is most closely related to the Philippine hawk-eagle (Nisaetus philipensis) with some taxonomists still considering it a subspecies, and Changeable hawk-eagle (Nisaetus cirrhatus) and hawk eagle species which is commonly distributed in Southeast Asia. EBird describes the bird as "A fairly large raptor of lowland and foothill forest in the southern Philippines. Dark brown above and whitish below with a streaked head and chest and a finely barred lower belly. Note the long hind crest and the chin stripe. In flight, shows barred wings and a fairly long tail both with a dark terminal band. Juveniles much paler. Remarkably similar to Philippine Honey-Buzzard, but head doesn’t project as far forward from the wings. Voice is a fairly high, screeching “week wik!”."

Distribution and habitat 
Its natural habitat is tropical moist highland forests approximately above 1200 meters above sea level.
It is threatened by habitat loss. Pinsker's hawk-eagle shares with Changeable hawk-eagles in terms of forest habitat. However, as endemic species it occupies the interior forest and high elevations compared with the most commonly distributed N. cirrhatus. This case is also similar with the situation of the Javan hawk-eagle (Nisaetus bartelsi) and endemic hawk eagle in Java Indonesia whereby the endemic species similarly occupies the interior and more elevated forest.

Status and conservation
The Pinsker's Hawk-Eagle is listed as Endangered species (IUCN status) with estimates of just 600 to 800 mature adults remaining. They are mainly threatened by habitat loss.

Based on unpublished data collected by the curators taking care of a captive Pinsker's hawk in Philippine Eagle Conservation Center (Philippine Eagle Foundation), every breeding season the natural pair hawk eagles produces one egg. The incubation takes 47 days, relatively close with the Javan hawk-eagle, in some irregular cases, 49 days is the longest ever recorded. Unlike the Philippine eagle which is naturally producing one egg in every two years, the N. pinskeri lays egg every year. The pair rare the young up to five months even in captivity.

After five months the fledgling stage takes place. During this time, the parent hawk eagles will intentionally stop delivering the food within the nest platform, instead to the nearest branch and eventually to the distanced branches to encourage the young for branching and flying in short distances. After flight training the parent hawk eagles will push the young for dispersal and look for its own niche.

Still in captivity, during incubation period only the female hawk eagle will brood the egg. The role of the male is to deliver food to the nest. However, the nest building and nest material collection is a sole responsibility of male. The curators will introduce different kind of twigs and leaves coming from the native tree species in the Malagos watershed. The male eagle will then choose the best material for nest building.

In captivity, copulation takes place four times every day and breeding season starts in early September to October and approximately courtship begun by March.

References

 Clements, J. F., T. S. Schulenberg, M. J. Iliff, B.L. Sullivan, C. L. Wood, and D. Roberson. 2011. The Clements checklist of birds of the world: Version 6.6

Pinsker's hawk-eagle
Endemic birds of the Philippines
Birds of Negros Island
Birds of Mindanao
Fauna of Leyte
Fauna of Samar
Pinsker's hawk-eagle